The 1951 Lehigh Engineers football team was an American football team that represented Lehigh University as an independent during the 1951 college football season. Lehigh won the Middle Three Conference championship for the second year in a row.

In their sixth year under head coach William Leckonby, the Engineers compiled a 7–2 record, winning both games against their conference opponents. John Bergman and Richard Pradetto were the team captains.

Lehigh played its home games at Taylor Stadium on the university's main campus in Bethlehem, Pennsylvania.

Schedule

References

Lehigh
Lehigh Mountain Hawks football seasons
Lehigh Engineers football